The Weekend Murders (also known as The Story of a Crime) is a 1970 Italian giallo film directed by Michele Lupo. It starred Ida Galli, Beryl Cunningham, Anna Moffo and Orchidea De Santis.

Plot
A family goes to a British estate to hear the reading of a will and while there they are murdered one by one, beginning with the butler. The murders are investigated by a Scotland Yard detective, played by Lance Percival, and a local Police Sergeant, played by Gastone Moschin.

Cast
 Anna Moffo as Barbara Worth 
 Gastone Moschin as Sgt. Aloisius Thorpe
 Ida Galli as Isabelle
 Lance Percival as Inspector Grey
 Peter Baldwin as Anthony Carter
 Chris Chittell as Georgie Kemple
 Quinto Parmeggiani as Lawrence Carter 
 Giacomo Rossi Stuart as Ted Collins
 Beryl Cunningham as Pauline Collins
 Marisa Fabbri as Gladys Kemple 
 Orchidea De Santis as the waitress
 Robert Hundar as the waiter 
 Ballard Berkeley as Peter, the butler 
 Richard Caldicot as Lawyer Caldicot 
 Harry Hutchinson as Harry, the gardener
 Barry Atsma as the Chef

Production 
The film was set and filmed on location at Somerleyton Hall, both for interior and exterior shots. There are also several scenes at Somerleyton railway station.

References

External links
 
 

1970 films
1970s crime thriller films
Giallo films
1970s Italian-language films
English-language Italian films
1970s English-language films
Films directed by Michele Lupo
Films scored by Francesco De Masi
Films with screenplays by Sergio Donati
Films set in the United Kingdom
Films shot in Suffolk
1970 multilingual films
Italian multilingual films
1970s Italian films